Sangarsha is an Indian Kannada language drama on Star Suvarna which premiered on 15 June 2020. It is the remake of Star Vijay's Ayutha Ezhuthu which stars Tejaswini Shekar, Vanitha Vasu and Rohith Rangaswamy.

Plot 
District collector officer Indira gets into a tiff with Bairadevi while she tries to open school for educating unprivileged  people in the village while Bairadevi tries to shut it and bring them under her control keeping them uneducated. Meanwhile, Indira falls in love with Bairadevi's son unaware that he is her son.

Cast and Characters 

 Indira (portrayed by Tejaswini Shekar)
 Bairadevi (portrayed by Vanitha Vasu)
 Raja (portrayed by Rohith Rangaswamy): Bairadevi's son
 Umapathi
 Bhupala
 Anaga: Vishwa's love interest
 Vishwa: Anaga's love interest
 Sathyamurthi: He advices and warns Indira on Bhiradevi's evil plans.

Guest appearances
 Hariprriya as Goddess Devi

Production 
The series was supposed to premiere on 23 March 2020. However, owing Covid-19 outbreak in India, production and shootings were stalled on 19 March 2020 and Kannada television shootings were permitted from June 2020. This made it to postpone and premiere on 15 June 2020. In September 2020, the series had a crossover with Muddulakshmi.

Adaptations

References 

2020 Indian television series debuts
Indian drama television series
Indian television soap operas
Kannada-language television shows
Star Suvarna original programming
Kannada-language television series based on Tamil-language television series